Concepticon is an open-source online lexical database of linguistic concept lists (word lists). It links concept labels (i.e., word list glosses) in concept lists (i.e., word lists) to concept sets (i.e., standardized word meanings).

It is part of the Cross-Linguistic Linked Data (CLLD) project, which is hosted by the Max Planck Institute for the Science of Human History in Jena, Germany. Version 1.0 was released in 2016.

Concept
Concept lists in the Concepticon include:

Swadesh list (100 items, 207 items, etc.)
Swadesh–Yakhontov list
Dolgopolsky list
Leipzig–Jakarta list
ASJP list

See also
Conceptualization (information science)
Ontology (information science)
Intercontinental Dictionary Series

References

List, Johann Mattis & Rzymski, Christoph & Greenhill, Simon & Schweikhard, Nathanael & Pianykh, Kristina & Tjuka, Annika & Hundt, Carolin & Forkel, Robert (eds.) 2021. CLLD Concepticon 2.5.0 [Data set]. Zenodo.

External links

Langavia Dictionary
Synonyms Dictionary

Lexical databases
Knowledge representation
Computational linguistics
Open data
Cross-Linguistic Linked Data
Linguistics lists
Word lists
Ontology (information science)